Félicité Island is a heavy forested granitic island  east of La Digue in the Seychelles.

Until the 1970s it was a coconut plantation that had a population of about 50. In the late 19th century, Félicité was home to Sultan Abdullah of Perak, who was exiled there by the British.

In 2007, the Seychelles government granted a 99-year lease for the then-uninhabited island, which was taken over by Singaporean real estate developer Kishore Buxani in 2013. Buxani and Mukesh Valabhji, a Seychellois developer, started the construction of a resort in mid-2013. Today, the Six Senses Zil Pasyon resort, with 30 villas and a spa, covers a third of the island.

Félicité and four granitic neighboring islands are considered "satellite islands" of La Digue. These four islands are routinely visited by tourists:
 Ile Cocos, a tiny islet (.017 km²) off the north coast of Félicité which has been part of a marine park since 1996.
For much of the 20th century they were coconut plantations.
The southern tip of Marianne is considered a "world class" diving location.

References

External links

 Aerial photo of Félicité

Islands of La Digue and Inner Islands
Somali Sea
Private islands of Seychelles
Leasehold islands